This is a list of all the recorded matches played by the Northern Mariana Islands national football team, which represents the Commonwealth of the Northern Mariana Islands in international men's football. The team is controlled by the governing body for football in the Northern Mariana Islands, the Northern Mariana Islands Football Association, which is a member of the East Asian Football Federation (EAFF) and since December 2020 a full member of the Asian Football Confederation (AFC).

The federation is not a member of the world governing body FIFA and so whilst the national team is eligible to enter AFC and EAFF-run competitions, they are currently ineligible for global competitions such as the FIFA World Cup and FIFA Confederations Cup. As such, they do not have an official FIFA ranking. However, the team have been consistently ranked as one of the worst teams in the world on the Elo ratings and were in fact, in July 2016 rated as the worst men's senior international team in the world in a ratings system that also includes a number of other non-FIFA teams.

Following the completion of the preliminary qualifying round for the 2019 EAFF E-1 Football Championship the team have won only one official competitive match against international opposition and have a goal difference of −60 in official matches. The team have never qualified for the finals of a major tournament and beyond friendlies and qualifying matches, their only official competition has been in an exhibition tournament in the regional Micronesian Games in 1998, which they won, to date their only tournament success.

Key

Key to matches
Att.=Match attendance
(H)=Home ground
(A)=Away ground
(N)=Neutral ground

Key to record by opponent
Pld=Games played
W=Games won
D=Games drawn
L=Games lost
GF=Goals for
GA=Goals against

Results
Northern Mariana Islands's score is shown first in each case.

Record by opponent

Up to matches played on 22 February 2022.

References

External links

 Men's senior all-time record and Elo rating
 Northern Mariana Islands – List of men's senior international matches at RSSSF

Northern Mariana Islands national football team
National association football team results
Lists of national association football team unofficial results